Robert John "Bob" Landers (1940-1996) was an Australian professional rugby league footballer in the New South Wales Rugby League competition for the Eastern Suburbs and Penrith clubs. A long-striding , Landers played with the Eastern Suburbs club from (1959-1965) and played in the Roosters 1960 grand final loss to St. George. He was a student of St Josephs’ College in Sydney.

Playing career
In 1959, Landers first season at the Eastern Suburbs club, he was selected to represent New South Wales rugby league team. Landers was the NSWRFL top point scorer in the 1960 NSWRFL season, and the 1961 NSWRFL season. After leaving Easts at the end of the 1965 season Landers joined English club Leeds before returning to Australia where he played with Penrith Panthers in their first season in the NSWRFL in 1967.

He retired as Penrith's leading point scorer after 4 seasons in 1970. Landers was named as a winger in Penrith's 'Greatest Team' since its inception in 1967. While playing football, Landers also served in the New South Wales Police Force, and in 2008, rugby league's centennial year in Australia, he was named on the wing in a NSW Police team of the century.

References

 Encyclopedia Of Rugby League Players (Alan Whiticker and Glen Hudson)

1940 births
1996 deaths
Australian police officers
Australian rugby league players
Leeds Rhinos players
New South Wales rugby league team players
Penrith Panthers players
Place of birth missing
Place of death missing
Rugby league fullbacks
Rugby league players from New South Wales
Rugby league wingers
Sydney Roosters players